Klas Dahlbeck (born 6 July 1991) is a Swedish professional ice hockey player who is currently playing with HC Davos of the National League (NL). He was selected by the Chicago Blackhawks in the 3rd round (79th overall) of the 2011 NHL Entry Draft.

Playing career

Dahlbeck made his professional debut in the Swedish Hockey League, with Linköpings HC in the 2009–10 season. After two more seasons in Sweden on 29 May 2012, Dahlbeck signed a three-year entry level contract with the Blackhawks.

Dahlbeck endured his first two North American seasons with AHL affiliate, the Rockford IceHogs, establishing himself as the franchise career leader in plus/minus before in the 2014–15 season he made his NHL debut with the Blackhawks on 6 December 2014 against the Nashville Predators.  He scored his first NHL goal on 11 December against Tuukka Rask of the Boston Bruins. On 28 February 2015, Dahlbeck was traded, along with Chicago's first round draft pick in 2015, to the Arizona Coyotes in exchange for Antoine Vermette.

On the eve of the 2016–17 season, Dahlbeck's tenure with the Coyotes came to a close as he was claimed off waivers by the Carolina Hurricanes on 11 October 2016.

After a year with the Carolina Hurricanes in which he played 43 games, he was resigned to a one year, $850,000 deal with the Hurricanes for 2017–18 on 21 April 2017. During the season he skated in 33 games for the Hurricanes, contributing with 1 goal and 5 points.

On 22 May 2018 the Hurricanes General Manager Don Waddell confirmed that Dahlbeck had left for KHL, agreeing to a one-year deal with CSKA Moscow.

Following the 2021–22 season, having claimed his second Gagarin Cup with CSKA during his four year tenure in the KHL, Dalhbeck opted to leave Russia as a free agent and was signed to a two-year contract with Swiss club, HC Davos of the NL, on 3 May 2022.

Career statistics

Regular season and playoffs

International

Awards and honors

References

External links
 

1991 births
Living people
Arizona Coyotes players
Carolina Hurricanes players
Charlotte Checkers (2010–) players
Chicago Blackhawks draft picks
Chicago Blackhawks players
HC CSKA Moscow players
HC Davos players
Linköping HC players
Rockford IceHogs (AHL) players
Swedish ice hockey defencemen
People from Katrineholm Municipality
Sportspeople from Södermanland County